The Hermitage Water is a river in Liddesdale, in the Scottish Borders area of Scotland. Among its many feeder burns are Braidley Burn, Dinley Burn, Gorrenberry Burn and Twislehope Burn. The Water flows through the hamlets of Dinley and Gorrenberry, and through the village of Hermitage, and past Hermitage Castle. It continues past Toftholm where it meets the B6399, and passes Newlands, Longhaugh, Leahaugh and Redheugh. At Sandholm it joins the Liddel Water and the dismantled railway.

See also
Hermitage, Scottish Borders
Rivers of Scotland
List of places in the Scottish Borders

External links
CANMORE/RCAHMS record of Liddel Water - Hermitage Water
Scottish Borders Council: Paths around Newcastleton
Geograph image: Hermitage Water and Castle
Geograph image: Fence across the Hermitage Water at Gorrenberry
SCRAN image: Roy Map 07/2e:Area around the Head of Hermitage Water, in Dumfriesshire and Roxburghshire

Rivers of the Scottish Borders
2Hermitage